Adewole Adebayo (born 8 January 1972) is a Nigerian Lawyer and Founder of KAFTAN TV.

He is currently running for President of Nigeria under the Social Democratic Party (Nigeria).

Early life and education
Adewole was born in Ondo City, Ondo State, on January 8, 1972. Between 1978 and 1983, he attended St. Stephen Primary School in Ondo. From 1983 to 1989, he attended St. Joseph College in Ondo. From 1991 to 1997, he attended Obafemi Awolowo University, where he earned a law degree. He was admitted to the Nigerian Bar in 2000 after graduating from the Nigerian Law School in Lagos and passing his bar exams. Adebayo later attended law school in the United States of America, where he passed the New York Bar Exams. Adebayo is licensed to practice in Australia, Canada, United Kingdom, California, New York, and federal courts in the United States.

Legal career 

Adewole Adebayo began his legal career as a litigation lawyer at Tunji Abayomi and Co in Lagos, Nigeria. After two years of legal practice, he founded his own law firm, Adewole Adebayo & Co., House of Law, in 2002.

One of the cases handled by his law firm in Nigeria was the case between Femi Falana and the Federal Government, in which Femi Falana (SAN) contested the constitutionality of the contract between the Ministry of Interior, the Nigeria Immigration Service, and Continental Transfert Technique Limited for the collection of Combined Expatriate and Residence Permit Aliens Card (CERPAC) fees. Adebayo represented Continental Transfert Technique Limited in the case.

In 2016, Adewole Adebayo established KAFTAN TV.

Philanthropy 

Adebayo sponsors nearly 2,000 young Nigerians in Nigerian and foreign tertiary institutions, in addition to numerous people he has financially empowered across the country.

Politics 

Adebayo is a public affairs commentator who provides advice on national issues on occasion. and participates in Nigerian politics as a member of the Third Force.

On January 15, 2022, Adewole Adebayo declared his intention to run for the office of the Nigerian president. He is running for president of Nigeria in the 2023 Nigerian general election under the Social Democratic Party (Nigeria).

References 

21st-century Nigerian politicians
1972 births
Living people